Hinton Charterhouse Pit is a 0.4 hectare geological Site of Special Scientific Interest near the village of Hinton Charterhouse, Bath and North East Somerset, notified in 1971.

The Hinton Sands, where a sparse bivalve fauna has been found, is an unusual sandy facies developed in the middle of the Forest Marble Jurassic Formation. This rock unit has strong associations with William Smith, who used the name Hinton Sands for the facies early in the 19th century.

References

Sites of Special Scientific Interest in Avon
Sites of Special Scientific Interest notified in 1971